Simo Kuzmanović (Serbian Cyrillic: Симо Кузмановић ; born 1 June 1986 in Derventa) is a retired Bosnian-Herzegovinian football striker.

He also hold Swiss nationality.

Club career
He had played with Swiss clubs FC Widnau, FC Chur 97, FC Gossau and FC Altstetten, Austrian FC Höchst and Premier League of Bosnia and Herzegovina club FK Modriča.

External links
 
 

1986 births
Living people
People from Derventa
Serbs of Bosnia and Herzegovina
Bosnia and Herzegovina footballers
Association football forwards
FC Chur 97 players
FC Gossau players
FK Modriča players
FK Sloga Doboj players
Swiss 1. Liga (football) players
Austrian Regionalliga players
Premier League of Bosnia and Herzegovina players
Bosnia and Herzegovina expatriate footballers
Expatriate footballers in Switzerland
Bosnia and Herzegovina expatriate sportspeople in Switzerland
Expatriate footballers in Austria
Bosnia and Herzegovina expatriate sportspeople in Austria